Ivan "Ivica" Brzić (28 May 1941 – 2 June 2014) was a Serbian football player and manager, the majority of whose playing career was spent with FK Vojvodina. He was also a member of the Yugoslavia squad that reached the final of 1968 European Championship.

He was born during World War II in the city of Novi Sad that had been annexed months before his birth by the Kingdom of Hungary (that participated in the Nazi invasion of the Kingdom of Yugoslavia in early April 1941), Brzić's early life was spent under foreign military occupation. 

He came up through all age levels in FK Vojvodina, but his senior career began with Sarajevo's FK Željezničar where he spent the first half of 1964-65 season. In December 1964, he returned to Vojvodina where he played next 8 seasons until summer 1972. He was an integral member of the squad that won the Yugoslav League in 1965-66 season. He transferred to Austrian Bundesliga where he played for Donawitzer SV Alpine and SK VÖEST Linz, where he began his coaching career.

In late September 2007 Brzić was named as new coach of FK Vojvodina after Milovan Rajevac resigned on 17 September 2007.

On 29 May 2008, it was announced that FK Vojvodina would not be extending his contract. On 4 June, six days later, it was announced that Dragoljub Bekvalac would be succeeding him on Vojvodina's bench.

Statistics

FK Novi Sad 66-0

References

External links
Brzic profile, reprezentacija.rs; accessed 30 July 2014. 

1941 births
2014 deaths
Serbian footballers
Footballers from Novi Sad
Yugoslav footballers
Yugoslav expatriate footballers
Yugoslav expatriates in Spain
Yugoslav First League players
RFK Novi Sad 1921 players
FK Željezničar Sarajevo players
FK Vojvodina players
FC Linz players
Yugoslavia international footballers
UEFA Euro 1968 players
Serbian expatriate footballers
Expatriate footballers in Austria
Club Universitario de Deportes managers
Club Alianza Lima managers
Club Blooming managers
Sport Boys managers
Serbian football managers
Serbian expatriate football managers
Yugoslav football managers
FK Vojvodina managers
FK Rad managers
La Liga managers
RCD Mallorca managers
CA Osasuna managers
Real Oviedo managers
Hércules CF managers
FC Linz managers
DSV Leoben managers
Expatriate football managers in Austria
Expatriate football managers in Bolivia
Expatriate football managers in Spain
Expatriate football managers in Peru
Association football midfielders